Piaroa is a genus of hubbardiid short-tailed whipscorpions, first described by Osvaldo Manzanilla, Alessandro Giupponi & Ana Tourinho in 2008.

Species 
, the World Schizomida Catalog accepts the following nine species:

 Piaroa bacata Moreno-González, Delgado-Santa & Armas, 2014 – Colombia
 Piaroa bijagua Armas & Víques, 2009 – Costa Rica
 Piaroa escalerete Moreno-González, Delgado-Santa & Armas, 2014 – Colombia
 Piaroa guipongai Villarreal & García, 2012 – Colombia
 Piaroa hoyosi Delgado-Santa & de Armas, 2013 – Colombia
 Piaroa pioi Villarreal, Armas & García, 2014 – Venezuela
 Piaroa turbacoensis Segovia-Paccini, Ahumada-C. & Moreno-González, 2018 – Colombia
 Piaroa virichaj Villarreal, Giupponi & Tourinho, 2008 – Venezuela
 Piaroa youngi Armas & Víquez, 2010 – Costa Rica, Panama

References 

Schizomida genera